The 1972 LSU Tigers football team represented Louisiana State University during the 1972 NCAA University Division football season.

LSU and Southeastern Conference rival Ole Miss became the last major universities to desegregate their varsity football squads this season.

The Sept. 30 game vs. Wisconsin marked the first appearance of a Big Ten Conference team at Tiger Stadium. Only two other Big Ten teams have played at Baton Rouge since: Indiana in 1978 and Ohio State in 1987 (Maryland and Nebraska each played in Baton Rouge before joining the Big Ten, as did future Big Ten member USC). 

LSU introduced a new helmet logo, a tiger head above the letters "LSU" inside a purple circle, a logo which was used through 1976. Also, player names were placed on jerseys for the first time.

Schedule

Roster

Rankings

Season summary

Auburn

Ole Miss

Bert Jones set school career records for completions, touchdowns and total offense.

Team players drafted into the NFL

References

LSU
LSU Tigers football seasons
LSU Tigers football